František Chládek (born 9 May 1958) is a Czech biathlete. He competed in the 20 km individual event at the 1988 Winter Olympics.

References

External links
 

1958 births
Living people
Czech male biathletes
Olympic biathletes of Czechoslovakia
Biathletes at the 1988 Winter Olympics
People from Vsetín
Sportspeople from the Zlín Region